Andro Giorgadze (born 3 May 1996) is a Georgian professional footballer who plays as a defender who plays for Torpedo Kutaisi.

Career 
Giorgadze is a product of Georgian Merani Martvili youth sportive school system. He signed contract with this team and played in the Erovnuli Liga.

In July 2017 he signed 2 years deal with the Ukrainian FC Vorskla Poltava.

References

External links

1996 births
Living people
Footballers from Tbilisi
Footballers from Georgia (country)
Expatriate footballers from Georgia (country)
Association football defenders
FC Merani Martvili players
FC Vorskla Poltava players
FC Fastav Zlín players
FC Karpaty Lviv players
FC Torpedo Kutaisi players
Erovnuli Liga players
Czech First League players
Ukrainian Premier League players
Expatriate footballers in Ukraine
Expatriate footballers in the Czech Republic
Expatriate sportspeople from Georgia (country) in Ukraine
Expatriate sportspeople from Georgia (country) in the Czech Republic